Amaxia peruana is a moth of the family Erebidae. It was described by Walter Rothschild in 1916. It is found in Peru.

References

Moths described in 1916
Amaxia
Moths of South America